SpongeBob SquarePants: Original Theme Highlights is the debut album of songs played on the Nickelodeon TV series SpongeBob SquarePants. It includes tracks sung by the cartoon's characters: SpongeBob SquarePants, Sandy Cheeks, Patrick Star, Squidward Tentacles, and Plankton. Its total running time is 9 minutes and 9 seconds, spanning seven tracks. This soundtrack was released on August 14, 2001 on CD by Nick Records, Epic Records, and Sony Music Soundtrax in the US.

The track "Pre-Hibernation" is an edited version of "Death Rattle" which was featured on Pantera's album, Reinventing the Steel.

Track listing

Digital album

References 

Original Theme Highlights
2001 EPs
2001 soundtrack albums
Television animation soundtracks